{{DISPLAYTITLE:C22H25N3O3}}
The molecular formula C22H25N3O3 may refer to:
 Niravoline, a chemical compound with diuretic and aquaretic effects
 Spiroxatrine, a drug which acts as a selective antagonist at both the 5-HT1A receptor and the α2C adrenergic receptor